The desman, a snouted and naked-tailed diving insectivore of the tribe Desmanini (also considered a subfamily, Desmaninae), belongs to one of two Eurasian species of the mole family, Talpidae.

This tribe consists of two monotypic genera of semiaquatic insectivores found in Europe: one in Russia and the other in the northwest of the Iberian peninsula and Pyrenees. Both species are considered to be vulnerable. They have webbed paws and their front paws are not well-adapted for digging. Desmans were much more diverse and widespread during the Miocene, with one genus, Gaillardia, being present in North America. Both living species are thought to have derived from the fossil genus Archaeodesmana.

The list of species is:
Genus Desmana
Russian desman (D. moschata)
Genus Galemys
Pyrenean desman (G. pyrenaicus)

 Genus †Archaeodesmana Miocene-Pliocene, Europe
 Genus †Gaillardia Miocene, North America
 Genus †Mygalinia Late Miocene, Hungary

In the media

References

Talpidae
Aquatic mammals
Taxa named by Oldfield Thomas